Blidingia minima is a species of seaweed in the Kornmanniaceae family. It was described by Johann Kylin in 1947.

Description
Stellate chloroplasts also exist. The tubes rise in groups from the center. It thalli grow as clusters which carry cylindrical and hollow tubes which arise from discoidal cushion.

Distribution
The species is found throughout eastern part of Asia in such countries as China,  Japan, Korea and eastern part of Russia. It is also found in Azores, Canada, Norway, South Africa, United States, and various gulfs, seas and oceans, such as Gulf of Maine and Gulf of Mexico and in Atlantic and Pacific Oceans and Wadden Sea. Besides this places it have a type locality which is Helgoland, Germany and is also common in Ireland and Great Britain. It was recorded in Queensland, Australia as well.

English distribution
In England, the species was recorded from East Sussex.

Habitat
It is found growing on cobble, boulders, bedrocks, barnacles, driftwood and even on different algae species throughout the semi-protected and protected areas.

Ecology
Blidingia minima is considered to be a food for periwinkles.

References

Further reading

Ulvales
Plants described in 1947
Flora of Asia
Flora of Europe
Flora of North America
Flora of South Africa
Taxa named by Friedrich Traugott Kützing